Bangaru Kanuka is a 1982 Telugu-language romance film, produced by Ravula Ankhaiah Gowd under the Ravindra Films banner and directed by V. Madhusudhana Rao. It stars Akkineni Nageswara Rao, Sridevi, Sujatha , with music composed by Satyam. This movie is remade from Tamil Movie Iru Malargal (1967).

Plot
The film begins on Ramesh (Akkineni Nageswara Rao) a college student, his father (Gummadi) decides to fix his alliance with his sister's daughter Shanti (Sujatha) who wholeheartedly loves him from childhood. Here, Ramesh refuses as he is already in love with his classmate Roopa (Sridevi) when clash arises between father & son but Shanti calms them down. Thereafter, Roopa reaches her hometown, informs Ramesh that she going to call him after taking approval from her brother (Ranganath). But unfortunately, her brother & sister-in-law (Annapurna) dies in an accident leaving their 3 infant children as orphans. Right now, to show the fidelity, Roopa decides to sacrifice her love and writes a letter to Ramesh that due to unforeseen situations, she has to marry another person. Listening to it, Ramesh collapses and Shanti makes him normal. At that point in time, Ramesh realizes her true love and both of them get married. Time passes, the couple leads a beautiful life and they are blessed with a baby girl Geeta. At present, Roopa returns as a school teacher of Geeta when disturbances & misunderstandings arise in Ramesh's life. At that juncture, Shanti learns the truth, so, she seeks to commit suicide when Roopa rescues her and reveals the reason behind deceiving Ramesh. At last, Roopa moves on to accomplish her responsibilities. Finally, the movie ends a happy note by Ramesh & Shanti continuing their marital life.

Cast
Akkineni Nageswara Rao as Ramesh
Sridevi as Roopa
Sujatha as Shanti 
Gummadi 
Allu Ramalingaiah
Ranganath 
Annapurna
Krishnaveni

Crew
Art: Bhaskar Rao
Choreography: Saleem, Heeralal, Prakash 
Stills: Mohanji-Jaganji
Lyrics: Veturi, Acharya Aatreya 
Dialogues: Acharya Aatreya
Music: Satyam
Camera: Harinath
Editing: D. Venkataratnam
Cinematography:P. S. Selvaraj
Producer: Ravula Ankhaiah Goud
Screenplay - Director: V. Madhusudhana Rao 
Banner: Ravindra Films
Release Date: 27 March 1982

Soundtrack

Music composed by Satyam.  Music released on EMI Columbia Audio Company.

References

Indian drama films
Films directed by V. Madhusudhana Rao
Films scored by Satyam (composer)